Shenzianyuloma is an extinct genus of vetulicolians, represented by a single species, Shenzianyuloma yunnanense, from the Maotianshan Shale during Stage 3 (518 million years ago) of the Cambrian period. It is notable for having a compact body shape akin to that of an angelfish.

The name of the genus is derived from the Chinese shénxiān yú (神仙鱼), meaning "angelfish", and an anagram of Mola.

References

Vetulicolia
Maotianshan shales fossils
Fossil taxa described in 2019